Lac-Témiscouata National Park is a provincial park located in Quebec, Canada south of the Saint Lawrence River, near the border with New Brunswick. Lake Touladi can also be found within the park's boundaries.

Lac-Témiscouata National Park contains a rich diversity of plant and animal life, including a forest, deer, and the Calypso plant.

There have also been more than 60 archaeological sites within the territory, proving that humans have occupied the area for thousands of years.

References

IUCN Category II
National parks of Quebec
Protected areas of Bas-Saint-Laurent